Body Language is the sixth album by jazz saxophonist Boney James, released in 1999.

Track listing

Personnel 
Musicians
 Boney James – soprano saxophone (1, 4, 6, 8), Yamaha WX7 (1, 3, 9), tenor saxophone (2, 3, 5, 8, 9), keyboards (2, 5-9), synth bass (5, 7), programming (5, 7), alto saxophone (7)
 Rex Rideout – keyboards (1), programming (1)
 David Torkanowsky – acoustic piano (2, 8), Fender Rhodes (6, 8), additional keyboards (7), acoustic piano solo (7), organ (8)
 Phil Davis – keyboards (3, 4), synth bass (3), programming (3, 4)
 Tim Heintz – additional keyboards (4, 8)
 Leon Bisquera – keyboards (6)
 Mark Ellis Stephens – keyboards (9)
 Paul Jackson Jr. – acoustic guitar (1), electric guitar (1), guitars (5)
 Rohn Lawrence – guitars (2), "right" guitars (3, 8)
 Tony Maiden – "left" guitars (3), guitars (9)
 Ronnie Garrett – bass (1)
 Alex Al – bass (2, 6, 9), synth bass (8)
 Larry Kimpel – bass (5)
 Lil' John Roberts – drums (2, 6, 9), additional drums (8)
 Donnell Spencer Jr. – drums (8), vocals (9)
 Paulinho da Costa – percussion (1, 2, 3, 6, 8)
 Lenny Castro – percussion (5, 7, 9)
 Rick Braun – flugelhorn (5)
 Chelle Davis – vocals (1)
 Shal – vocals (4)

Arrangements
 Boney James (1, 2, 5-9)
 Rex Rideout (1)
 Paul Brown (2, 6, 8, 9)
 Phil Davis (3, 4)
 Impromp2 (4)
 Mark Ellis Stephens (9)

String section (Tracks 2, 6 & 9)
 Jerry Hey – arrangements and conductor
 Ralph Morrison – concertmaster
 Stephen Erdody (principal), Christine Ermacoff, Paula Hochhalter, Armen Ksajikan, Christina Soule and Cecilia Tsan – cello 
 Margot Aldcroft, Brian Dembow (principal), Thomas Diener, Jennie Hansen, Carrie Holzman-Little and Victoria Miskolczy – viola
 Richard Altenbach, Jackie Brand, Mario De Leon, Henry Gronnier, Lily Ho Chen, Karen Jones, Frances Moore, Ralph Morrison, Sara Parkins and Kenneth Yerke – violin

Production 
 Boney James – producer 
 Paul Brown – producer, engineer 
 Ronnie Garrett – co-producer (1)
 Martin Christensen – engineer 
 Don Murray – engineer 
 Bill Schnee – engineer, mixing 
 Erik Zobler – engineer 
 Koji Egawa – mix assistant 
 Stephen Marcussen – mastering 
 Lexy Shroyer – production coordinator 
 Vigon/Ellis – art direction, design 
 Robert Zuckerman – photography 
 Diane Kranz – stylist
 Howard Lowell – management 

Studios
 Recorded at Alpha Studios (Burbank, California); Funky Joint Studios and Heintz 57 Varieties Studio (Sherman Oaks, California); Sunset Sound (Hollywood, California); Schnee Studios (North Hollywood, California); Silent Partner Studios (Philadelphia, Pennsylvania).
 Mixed at Schnee Studios
 Mastered at Precision Mastering (Hollywood, California).

Charts

Weekly charts

Year-end charts

References

1999 albums
Warner Records albums
Boney James albums